List of Justices in the Supreme Court of Norway.

Current
Accurate as of 15 March 2018.

Former
The symbol † denotes that the Justice died while in office.

References